The Qubit fluorometer is a lab instrument developed by Invitrogen (now part of Thermo Fisher) that is used for the quantification of DNA, RNA, and protein.

Principle 
The most common method of measuring the concentration of nucleic acids and protein is the UV-absorbance method. This method uses a spectrophotometer to measure the natural absorbance of light at 260 nm (for DNA and RNA) or 280 nm (for proteins). The Qubit fluorometer uses fluorescent dyes to determine the concentration of either nucleic acids or proteins in a sample. It requires additional fluorescent dyes that bind specifically to analytes of interest such as double-stranded DNA (dsDNA), single-stranded DNA (ssDNA), RNA,  or protein.

Fluorescent dyes 

Each dye is specific for one type of molecule (DNA, RNA or protein). These dyes exhibit low fluorescence until bound to their target molecule. The difference in fluorescence between bound and unbound dye is the several orders of magnitude. Upon binding to DNA, the dye molecules (PicoGreen) assume a more rigid shape and become intensely fluorescent, most likely due to intercalation between the bases. Once added to a solution of DNA, the Qubit DNA dye binds to the DNA within seconds and reaches equilibrium in less than two minutes. At a specific concentration of the dye, the intensity of the fluorescence signal from this mixture is directly proportional to the concentration of DNA in the solution, even in the presence of other biomolecules. 

The Qubit fluorometer picks this fluorescence signal up and converts it into a DNA concentration measurement by referring to DNA probes of known concentration. It then uses this relationship to calculate the concentration of a sample.

The Qubit quantitation system includes the following dyes that are specific for different biomolecules and concentrations (ds stands for double-stranded, ss for single-stranded DNA):

Comparison with other devices 
The Qubit measures DNA, RNA and protein in much the same way as other fluorometers; by measuring the fluorescence of the molecular probe dyes and producing measurements of concentration and absorbance. 

The Qubit's standard curves are preprogrammed, so data plotting and sample concentration calculation is done automatically.

Versions 
The second generation, the Qubit 2.0 Fluorometer, was released in 2010, the 3rd generation as Qubit 3.0 in 2014. The newest version is Qubit 4 which was launched in 2017.

References

External links 
 Official Qubit Fluorometric Quantitation web site
 A review of the Qubit fluorometer

Laboratory equipment
Spectroscopy
Fluorescence